Derek Trail (born in Leith, 2 January 1946) is a Scottish former professional footballer. He started his career at Tynecastle Athletic before signing for Rangers for whom he made 4 first-team appearances between 1963 and 1966. Later clubs included Falkirk, Workington and Hartlepool United. After a spell in Australia with Sutherland he returned to Scotland where he ended his career with first Meadowbank Thistle and then Alloa Athletic.

References

1946 births
Living people
People from Leith
Footballers from Edinburgh
Scottish footballers
Association football forwards
Scottish Football League players
English Football League players
Rangers F.C. players
Falkirk F.C. players
Workington A.F.C. players
Hartlepool United F.C. players
Sutherland Sharks FC players
Livingston F.C. players
Alloa Athletic F.C. players
Scottish expatriate footballers
Expatriate soccer players in Australia
Scottish expatriate sportspeople in Australia